"Old King Cole" is a British nursery rhyme first attested in 1708. Though there is much speculation about the identity of King Cole, it is unlikely that he can be identified reliably as any historical figure. It has a Roud Folk Song Index number of 1164.  The poem describes a merry king who called for his pipe, bowl, and musicians, with the details varying among versions.

The "bowl" is a drinking vessel,  while it is unclear whether the "pipe" is a musical instrument or a tobacco pipe.

Lyrics
The most common modern version of the rhyme is:

Old King Cole was a merry old soul,
And a merry old soul was he;
He called for his pipe, and he called for his bowl,
And he called for his fiddlers three.
Every fiddler he had a fiddle,
And a very fine fiddle had he;
Oh, there's none so rare, as can compare,
With King Cole and his fiddlers three.

The song is first attested in William King's Useful Transactions in Philosophy in 1708–9.

King's version has the following lyrics:

Good King Cole,
And he call'd for his Bowle,
And he call'd for Fidler's three;
And there was Fiddle, Fiddle,
And twice Fiddle, Fiddle,
For 'twas my Lady's Birth-day,
Therefore we keep Holy-day
And come to be merry.

Identity of King Cole

There is much speculation about the identity of King Cole, but it is unlikely that he can be identified reliably given the centuries between the attestation of the rhyme and the putative identities; none of the extant theories is well supported.

William King mentions two possibilities: the "Prince that Built Colchester" and a 12th-century cloth merchant from Reading named Cole-brook. Sir Walter Scott thought that "Auld King Coul" was Cumhall, the father of the giant Fyn M'Coule (Finn McCool). Other modern sources suggest (without much justification) that he was Richard Cole (1568–1614) of Bucks in the parish of Woolfardisworthy on the north coast of Devon, whose monument and effigy survive in All Hallows Church, Woolfardisworthy.

Coel Hen theory
It is often noted that the name of the legendary Welsh king Coel Hen can be translated 'Old Cole' or 'Old King Cole'. This sometimes leads to speculation that he, or some other Coel in Roman Britain, is the model for Old King Cole of the nursery rhyme. However, there is no documentation of a connection between the fourth-century figures and the eighteenth-century nursery rhyme. There is also a dubious connection of Old King Cole to Cornwall and King Arthur found at Tintagel Castle that there was a Cornish King or Lord Coel.

Further speculation connects Old King Cole and thus Coel Hen to Colchester, but in fact Colchester was not named after Coel Hen. Connecting with the musical theme of the nursery rhyme, according to a much later source, Coel Hen supposedly had a daughter who was skilled in music, according to Geoffrey of Monmouth, writing in the 12th century.

 
A legend that King Coel of Colchester was the father of the Empress Saint Helena, and therefore the grandfather of Constantine the Great, appeared in Henry of Huntingdon's Historia Anglorum and Geoffrey of Monmouth's Historia Regum Britanniae. The passages are clearly related, even using some of the same words, but it is not clear which version was first. Henry appears to have written the relevant part of the Historia Anglorum before he knew about Geoffrey's work, leading J. S. P. Tatlock and other scholars to conclude that Geoffrey borrowed the passage from Henry, rather than the other way around. The source of the claim is unknown, but may have predated both Henry and Geoffrey. Diana Greenway proposes it came from a lost hagiography of Helena; Antonia Harbus suggests it came instead from oral tradition.

Cole-brook theory
In the 19th century William Chappell, an expert on popular music, suggested the possibility that the "Old King Cole" was really "Old Cole", alias Thomas Cole-brook, a supposed 12th-century Reading cloth merchant whose story was recounted by Thomas Deloney in his Pleasant History of Thomas of Reading (c. 1598), and who was well known as a character in plays of the early 17th century. The name "Old Cole" had some special meaning in Elizabethan theatre, but it is unclear what it was.

Modern usage

King Cole is often referenced in popular culture.

In art

The Maxfield Parrish mural Old King Cole (1894) for the Mask and Wig Club was sold by Christie's for $662,500 in 1996.  Parrish executed a second Old King Cole (1906) for The Knickerbocker Hotel, which was moved to the St. Regis New York in 1948, and is the centerpiece of its King Cole Bar.

As a marching cadence
The United States military has used versions of the traditional rhyme in the form of marching cadences, since at least the 1920s up to the present.

In music 
Old King Cole was the topic of a 1923 work by Vaughan Williams, a work created as a one-act ballet.

In 1960, a variation of the song was released on Harry Belafonte's Live Album Belafonte Returns to Carnegie Hall.

The first four lines of Old King Cole are quoted in the song The Musical Box, by British rock band Genesis on their third album, Nursery Cryme, released in 1971.

The melody is also used in the song Great King Rat, by British rock band Queen on their eponymous debut album Queen, released in 1973 with the lyrics adapted to:
"Great King Rat was a dirty old man,
And a dirty old man was he,
Now what did I tell you?
Would you like to see?"

The jazz musician Nathaniel Coles took the name Nat King Cole.

In the 2012 album Once Upon a Time (In Space), Old King Cole is used as inspiration for both the lyrics and melody of the second track, also titled Old King Cole.

In fiction 

In his 1897 collection Mother Goose in Prose, L. Frank Baum included a story explaining the background to the nursery rhyme. In this version, Cole is a donkey-riding commoner  who is selected at random to succeed the King of Whatland when the latter dies without heir.

In P. L. Travers’ Mary Poppins Opens the Door, the titular character tells her charges a story about how King Cole remembered that he was a merry old soul.

James Joyce made reference to the rhyme in Finnegans Wake (619.27f):
With pipe on bowl. Terce for a fiddler, sixt for makmerriers, none for a Cole.
Cole".

The Old King Cole theme appeared twice in 1933 cartoons: Walt Disney made a Silly Symphony cartoon called "Old King Cole", in which the character holds a huge party where various nursery rhyme characters are invited. Walter Lantz produced an Oswald cartoon the same year, entitled The Merry Old Soul, which is in reference to the nursery rhyme.

The Three Stooges' 1948 short film "Fiddlers Three" features Larry, Moe and Shemp as musicians in King Cole's court who must stop an evil wizard from stealing the king's daughter.

In the Fables comic book, King Cole was the long-time mayor of Fabletown.

In the fifteenth season of Dropout's tabletop role-playing game show Dimension 20, "Neverafter", Old King Cole is a character who was once the king of the kingdom of Jubilee.

In humour and satire

G. K. Chesterton wrote a poem ("Old King Cole: A Parody") which presented the nursery rhyme successively in the styles of several poets: Alfred Lord Tennyson, W. B. Yeats, Robert Browning, Walt Whitman, and Algernon Charles Swinburne.  Much later, Mad ran a feature similarly postulating classical writers' treatments of fairy tales. The magazine had Edgar Allan Poe tackle "Old King Cole", resulting in a cadence similar to that of "The Bells":
Old King Cole was a merry old soul
Old King Cole, Cole, Cole, Cole, Cole, Cole, Cole.

In political cartoons and similar material, especially in Great Britain, sometimes Old King "Coal" has been used to symbolize the coal industry.

Notes

References

Geoffrey of Monmouth (c. 1136). History of the Kings of Britain.
Henry of Huntingdon (c. 1129), Historia Anglorum.
Kightley, C (1986), Folk Heroes of Britain. Thames & Hudson.
Morris, John. The Age of Arthur: A History of the British Isles from 350 to 650. New York: Charles Scribner's Sons, 1973. .
Opie, I & P (1951), The Oxford Dictionary of Nursery Rhymes. Oxford University Press.
Skene, WF (1868), The Four Ancient Books of Wales. Edmonston & Douglas.

Cole
Coel the Old
Coel Hen
English folklore
4th-century monarchs in Europe
3rd-century monarchs in Europe
English folk songs
English children's songs
Traditional children's songs
1708 works
1708 in England
English nursery rhymes
Cumulative songs
Songs about kings
Songs about fictional male characters